The 1962 European Baseball Championship was held in the Netherlands and was won by the Netherlands for the fifth time in a row. Italy finished as runner-up.

Ron Fraser served as manager of the Netherlands.

Standings

References

(NL) European Championship Archive at honkbalsite

European Baseball Championship
European Baseball Championship
1962
1962 in Dutch sport